Ahmed Issam Allam (born 13 September 1931) is an Egyptian gymnast. He competed at the 1952 Summer Olympics and the 1960 Summer Olympics.

References

External links
 

1931 births
Possibly living people
Egyptian male artistic gymnasts
Olympic gymnasts of Egypt
Gymnasts at the 1952 Summer Olympics
Gymnasts at the 1960 Summer Olympics
Sportspeople from Cairo
20th-century Egyptian people